Luna Luna was a German rock band from Recklinghausen, Germany formed in 1989. The founding members were Frank Niggemann (vocals), Stefan Kahé (guitar), Markus Schroer (keyboards), Lambert Stallmeyer (bass), Wolfgang Bahne (drums) and Bettina Hagemann (violin). They continued to perform until 1997, when the band was formally dissolved.

The group released several singles and three albums: Es war einmal (“Once upon a time”) in 1993, Rosa (“Pink”) in 1994 and Supernova in 1997. Their most successful single “Küss mich” (“Kiss me”) entered the German single charts in 1993. Nonetheless is the song “Wenn ich tot bin (sollst du tanzen)” [“When I'm dead (you should dance”)] from the Supernova album considered to be the band’s most famous one.

Discography

Albums 
 1993: Es war einmal
 1994: Rosa
 1997: Supernova

Singles
 1993: Küss Mich
 1993: Schwarze Rose
 1993: 60 Sekunden
 1994: Rosa
 1994: Sturmalarm
 1994: Gibt es noch Liebe?
 1995: Sehnsucht

References

External links
 Former official website at web.archive.org (German)
 Luna Luna at lastfm.com
 Luna Luna at musicbrainz.org

German rock music groups